The St. John's Episcopal Church is a historic church at 117 Harrison Street in Camden, Arkansas.  It is a large cruciform structure, built out of brick with trim of concrete cast to resemble stone.  Its Gothic features include buttresses at the corners and along the sides, and pointed-arch openings for entrances and windows at the gable ends.  The church was built in 1925-26 for a congregation established in 1850; it was designed by the Texarkana firm of Witt, Seibert & Halsey.  It is the city's only Episcopal church.

The church was listed on the National Register of Historic Places in 2017.

See also
National Register of Historic Places listings in Ouachita County, Arkansas

References

Episcopal church buildings in Arkansas
Churches on the National Register of Historic Places in Arkansas
Gothic Revival church buildings in Arkansas
Churches completed in 1926
Buildings and structures in Camden, Arkansas
National Register of Historic Places in Ouachita County, Arkansas
1926 establishments in Arkansas